The Edifício Copan (Copan Building) is a 118.44-metre (459 ft.) tall, 38-story residential building in downtown São Paulo, Brazil. It has 1,160 apartments, 70 commercial establishments and is one of the largest buildings in Brazil.

Design, construction and name 
The building was designed by Oscar Niemeyer's office in São Paulo; Niemeyer was personally responsible for the building's famous sinuous façade. The idea was a building open to a mixed cross-section of Brazilian society. The original project envisioned two buildings, the other being a hotel, but in the end only the residential building was built.

Construction began in 1952 and, following some interruptions, was completed in 1966. It is one of the largest buildings in Brazil.

The building's name is an acronym for its original developer, Companhia Pan-Americana de Hotéis e Turismo (Portuguese for "Pan-American Hotels and Tourism Company").

Facilities 
Currently, the building has 1,160 apartments, ranging from small studios to large three-bedroom units, and 2,038 residents, served by 20 elevators and 221 underground parking spaces. The ground floor is home to 72 businesses and establishments including (since the 1990s) an evangelical church, a travel agency, a bookstore, and 4 restaurants. Its site is 10,572.80 square meters (113,805 square feet) in area.

Due to the large number of residents, the Brazilian postal service assigned the building its own postal code ("CEP"): 01046-925. The current condominium has over 100 employees to serve residents and to conduct maintenance.

Niemeyer's original design contained a park outside the building, a second park in an open area of the first floor, and a roof-deck. The park outside is now used by a bank building; the first floor park and roof-deck are closed.

Since 2014 the entire building has been covered by a transparent blue-black drape, to protect pedestrians from the facade's loose mosaic tiles.  A project to repair and replace the building's 72 million exterior tiles is currently under consideration.

In popular culture 
The Copan Building has inspired writers, filmmakers, photographers, and other artists from all over the world. A short story collection titled Arca sem Noé - Histórias do Edifício Copan ("Ark without Noah - Stories from the Copan Building"), by Brazilian author Regina Rheda, was published in Portuguese in 1994 and won the 1995 Jabuti prize in Brazil. It has also been published in English as Stories From the Copan Building, within the volume First World Third Class and Other Tales of the Global Mix (University of Texas Press).

The Copan Building appeared on the second episode of The Amazing Race 9 and was the site of a task in which contestants had to run up one of the building's fire escapes and rappel down an exterior wall.

The building is available to build in the 2013 game SimCity.

Gallery

See also
 List of Oscar Niemeyer works

References

Bibliography 
 "Stories from the Copan Building" in FIRST WORLD THIRD CLASS AND OTHER TALES OF THE GLOBAL MIX, by Regina Rheda. Austin: University of Texas Press, 2005.
 Arca sem Noé - Histórias do Edifício Copan, by Regina Rheda. Rio: Record, 2010. Short stories in Portuguese.

External links

 Edifício Copan Administration's Web site 

Copan
Copan
Copan
Copan
Copan
Tourist attractions in São Paulo
Residential skyscrapers in Brazil
Retail buildings in Brazil